Abdul Hai is a politician of Naogaon District of Bangladesh and former member of parliament for Naogaon-5 constituency in 1988.

Career 
Abdul Hai was elected to parliament from Naogaon-5 as an independent candidate in 1988. He was defeated in the 5th Jatiya Sangsad elections on 1991 as a candidate of Jatiya Party from Naogaon-5 constituency.

References 

Living people
Year of birth missing (living people)
People from Naogaon District
Jatiya Party (Ershad) politicians
4th Jatiya Sangsad members